Stoneville is a town in Rockingham County, North Carolina, United States. Stoneville is part of the Greensboro–High Point metropolitan area of the Piedmont Triad. On March 20th, 1998, an EF-3 tornado touched down in neighboring Madison and Mayodan after the system had crossed into Rockingham County from Stokes County. Then, it strengthened into a EF-3 as it crossed Route 220 as it followed the train tracks to downtown Stoneville.

History
Settlers came to the ridge between the Mayo and Dan rivers in the northwest Piedmont region in the early 1800s. In 1827, the Deep Springs Plantation was built for James Madison Scales and his wife Elizabeth Lesuer in what is now Stoneville. In 1843 the R.H. Lewis Tobacco company was established in the south side of the land that was to become the town of Stoneville. In the late 1850s, brothers Thomas and Pinkney Stone bought land in the area. On March 5, 1877, the town was officially incorporated. A natural stop on the Norfolk-Western rail line, Stoneville became the trade hub for the surrounding localities and profited off of tobacco, cotton and grist-milling industries.

On March 20, 1998, Stoneville was struck by an F3 tornado. It caused severe damage to commercial structures in the town's main business district along Henry Street, destroyed the railway depot, and killed one person in the town. Several buildings in the downtown were completely removed, and most cleanup and repair work was done within a year. The town later built Friendship Park and painted a mural at the site of a destroyed store to commemorate the victim killed in the town and a farmer killed further west in the county.

Geography

Stoneville is located at  (36.465836, -79.906342).

Demographics

2020 census

As of the 2020 United States census, there were 1,308 people, 474 households, and 374 families residing in the town.

2010 census
As of the census of 2010, there were 1,056 people, 469 households, and 292 families residing in the town. The population density was 820.4 people per square mile (317.1/km). There were 518 housing units at an average density of 424.1 per square mile (163.9/km). The racial makeup of the town was 77.64% White, 19.26% African American, 0.10% Pacific Islander, 2.10% from other races, and 0.90% from two or more races. Hispanic or Latino of any race were 3.59% of the population.

There were 469 households, out of which 20.7% had children under the age of 18 living with them, 47.3% were married couples living together, 11.9% had a female householder with no husband present, and 37.7% were non-families. 35.2% of all households were made up of individuals, and 20.0% had someone living alone who was 65 years of age or older. The average household size was 2.13 and the average family size was 2.73.

In the town, the population was spread out, with 20.0% under the age of 18, 5.8% from 18 to 24, 24.8% from 25 to 44, 25.9% from 45 to 64, and 23.6% who were 65 years of age or older. The median age was 45 years. For every 100 females, there were 83.5 males. For every 100 females age 18 and over, there were 79.0 males.

The median income for a household in the town was $28,313, and the median income for a family was $39,375. Males had a median income of $26,167 versus $21,354 for females. The per capita income for the town was $17,255. About 8.2% of families and 12.7% of the population were below the poverty line, including 17.0% of those under age 18 and 20.9% of those age 65 or over.

Attractions 
 Deep Springs Plantation
 Mulberry Island Plantation
 Rockingham County NC Shiloh Airport

Notable people 
 Beth Mitchell (1972-1998), competitive shag dancer
 J.J. Webster (1898-1965) - farmer, businessman, politician
 Jeff Webster (born 1966) - checkers champion
 John Ray Webster (born 1942) - checkers champion
 T. Clarence Stone (1899–1969) - politician and businessman
 William F. Stone (1909-1973) - lawyer and politician
 Tabitha Brown (born 1979) - actress and social media personality

References

External links
 
 The Madison Messenger, the area's community newspaper
 Stoneville's devastating tornado of March 20, 1998

Towns in Rockingham County, North Carolina
Towns in North Carolina